Jacqueline Maria Hagan (born August 28, 1954) is a Chilean-born American sociologist who has been the Kenan Professor of Sociology at the University of North Carolina at Chapel Hill since 2017. She is known for her research on immigration from Latin America to the United States, and on the effects of the United States' immigration policies on immigrants. This work has included studies of the social effects of deportations of undocumented immigrants to their home countries, and research on changes in the frequency of different causes of migrant deaths along the Mexico–United States border.

Career
After receiving her Ph.D. from the University of Texas at Austin in 1990, Hagan joined the faculty of the University of Houston as an assistant professor, where she became an associate professor and the co-director of the Center for Immigration Research in 1995. In 2005, she joined the faculty of the University of North Carolina at Chapel Hill (UNC-Chapel Hill) as an associate professor of sociology, where she was named a full professor in 2009. From 2012 to 2016, she was the Robert G. Parr Distinguished Term Professor of Sociology at UNC-Chapel Hill.

Publications
 Deciding to be legal : a Maya community in Houston, 1994
 Social networks, gender and immigrant settlement : resource and constraint, 1996
 Central Americans in the United States, 1996
 Migration miracle : faith, hope, and meaning on the undocumented journey, 2008
 Skills of the "unskilled" : work and mobility among Mexican migrants, 2015

References

External links
Faculty page

1954 births
Living people
American women social scientists
American women sociologists
American sociologists
Chilean emigrants to the United States
University of North Carolina at Chapel Hill faculty
University of Houston faculty
Columbian College of Arts and Sciences alumni
University of Texas at Austin College of Liberal Arts alumni
Members of the Sociological Research Association